
Gostynin County is a unit of territorial administration and local government (powiat) in Masovian Voivodeship, east-central Poland. It came into being on January 1, 1999, as a result of the Polish local government reforms passed in 1998.

As of 2019 its total population is 43,099, out of which the population of Gostynin is 18,588, and the rural population is 24,511.

Neighbouring counties
Gostynin County is bordered by Płock County to the north-east, Sochaczew County to the east, Łowicz County to the south-east, Kutno County to the south and Włocławek County to the north-west.

Administrative division
The county is subdivided into five gminas (one urban and four rural). These are listed in the following table, in descending order of population.

References

 
Gostynin